The Oklahoma Secretary of Public Safety is a member of the Oklahoma Governor's Cabinet. The Secretary is appointed by the Governor, with the consent of the Oklahoma Senate, to serve at the pleasure of the Governor. The Secretary serves as the chief advisor to the Governor on public safety and criminal justice.

The current Secretary-Designate is Tricia Everest who was appointed by Governor Kevin Stitt in 2021 and awaits Senate confirmation, and if confirmed will be the first woman to hold this position.

Overview
The Secretary of Public Safety was established in 1986 to provide greater oversight and coordination to the public safety and criminal justice activities of the State government. The position was established, along with the Oklahoma Governor's Cabinet, by the Executive Branch Reform Act of 1986. The Secretary advises the Governor on public safety policy and advises the state's public safety agencies on new policy as directed by the Governor. The Secretary also provides the overarching management structure for the state's criminal justice agencies in order to deliver improved public services while eliminating redundancies and reducing support costs in order to more effectively and efficiently run the agencies in a unified manner. 

The Secretary is responsible for overseeing State police services, criminal investigations, criminal justice and adult criminal corrections. The Secretary also coordinates the State's justice system by overseeing all state prosecutors and generally maintains public order throughout the State through oversight of all State law enforcement agencies. Homeland security, emergency management and law enforcement training are also overseen by the Secretary. The Secretary serves ex officio as the Governor's Representative for Highway Safety. As such, the Secretary is responsible for administering all funds from the National Highway Traffic Safety Administration for the purposes of promoting highway safety.

Oklahoma state law allows for Cabinet Secretaries to serve concurrently as the head of a State agency in addition to their duties as a Cabinet Secretary. Historically, the Secretary of Public Safety has also served as the Commissioner of the Oklahoma Department of Public Safety. However, the current Secretary Chip Keating does not share this role, with the position Commissioner currently filled by Rusty Rhoades.

The Secretary, unless filling an additional role which carries a greater salary, is entitled to annual pay of $85,000.

Reporting officials
Officials reporting to the Secretary include:

Budget
The Secretary of Public Safety oversees a budget for Fiscal Year 2020 of $1 billion. The budget authorization is broken down as follows:

List of Secretaries

References

External links
 Oklahoma Homeland Security Director Named, Oklahoma Office of Homeland Security, 1-20-04

Safety and Security
Safety and Security
Government agencies established in 1986
1986 establishments in Oklahoma